Heritage Iron Magazine was founded in 2008 for those interested in muscle tractors. Muscle Tractors are a classification of tractors specifically produced from the 1960s to the mid-1980s that feature turbo, duals, and front wheel assist. Muscle tractors were a turning point in American farm mechanization when horsepower was taking over from steel wheels and crank-start tractors. This generation of tractors has been growing in popularity among tractor collectors.  The magazine was founded to satiate the heritage farmer’s appetite. Heritage Iron features all brands, all makes, and all models of muscle tractors from the 1960s to mid 1980s including the equipment that the tractors used. It is published out of Greenville, Illinois, by 3-Point Ink, LLC.

History
Founded in 2008, Heritage Iron Magazine is published by 3-Point Ink, LLC. Sherry Schaefer is the owner, publisher, and editor of the magazine.  Heritage Iron is a bi-monthly publication that features all brands of muscle tractors from the 1960s to 1990. Each issue highlights a featured tractor and presents a detailed account of that tractor, its attributes, its history, and its owner. Other regular features in the magazine are machinery milestones, equipment company history, classified ads, auction results, letters to the editor, an editor’s page, farm toys, literature and memorabilia.

The first issue was mailed in January 2009 and featured an International Harvester 1206 on the front cover. Other tractors that have appeared on the cover include: John Deere 8020, Allis-Chalmers 220, Case Spirit of ’76, Minneapolis Moline G1000, Oliver 2255, Massey 97, John Deere 5020, International Harvester 1568, and the Steiger Tiger.

The Niche Magazine Conference awarded Heritage Iron Best New Launch of 2008.

Heritage Iron is currently creating an option for an online digital magazine option for the tech savvy subscribers.

Distinctive Features 

Heritage Iron created and patented its own publication mascot, Brutus.  Brutus is a cartoon character depicting a muscle bound tractor with human characteristics. Brutus was patented on December 22, 2009.  The Brutus logo appears on the front cover of each magazine and in much of the advertising, public relations, and sponsorship material.

Heritage Iron uses vibe stripes throughout its magazine and advertising pieces as a visual reminder of the way the muscle tractors were painted. Vibe stripes are stripes on a tractor that begin as a thin stripe and gradually become thicker.

Heritage Iron has its own line of toy muscle tractors manufactured and sold through SpecCast Toys of Dyersville, Iowa. Two highly detailed 1/64 scale toys will be released each year starting in 2011 and will continue for the next five years. All the tractors will be a part of the  “Heritage Iron Series", and the first toy muscle tractor will be an Oliver 2255.

Heritage Iron has recently partnered with Farm Journal and AGWEB to produce a Heritage Iron Blog. The blog has regular contributions from Sherry and some of Heritage Iron writers.

Writers
Heritage Iron Magazine has a diverse staff of hand-picked writers that each bring a different dynamic to the publication. Some of the regular contributors include:

Tharran Gaines
Larry Gay
Jim Gay
Cindy Ladage
Ken Updike
Fred Hendricks

Circulation 
 
Heritage Iron Magazine started with 4,000 subscribers in 2008.  2011 circulation numbers have more than tripled to 13,000, including oversees subscribers in Australia, the Netherlands, Canada, Germany, Puerto Rico, Denmark, Switzerland, New Zealand, the UK, and more. Heritage Iron is also available in over 700 Tractor Supply stores and select newsstands throughout the United States.

Publisher & Editor 
Sherry Schaefer is a Greenville, Illinois (Bond County) native who grew up around tractors and equipment. Her grandfather, Ervin Schaefer, was an Oliver tractor dealer in both Granite City and Hamel, Illinois from 1936 -1965. Her father, Oliver “Ollie” Schaefer, is a used Oliver tractor and equipment dealer in Greenville, Illinois. The Schaefer family also owned and operated a national tractor pulling sled service for more than 25 years beginning in the late 1960s.

When she was not tractor-pulling, Schaefer worked as a truck driver hauling grain to elevators along the Mississippi River. The hours she spent on the farm loading grain and tractor pulling gave her vast exposure to tractors of all makes and models to which she gained an affection for. In 1993 Schaefer became the editor of the Hart-Parr Oliver Collectors magazine. Schaefer served in this capacity for 10 ½ years before venturing out on her own.
Schaefer began her own bi-monthly Oliver publication in 2004, known as Oliver Heritage Magazine. In 2008 she took a giant step and formed her own publishing company, 3-Point Ink, LLC, in Nokomis, IL. At the same time, she started a new bi-monthly tractor publication, known as Heritage Iron Magazine. Schaefer is in possession of the largest, most comprehensive collection of Oliver literature in the world, in addition to an abundant collection of literature regarding all makes and models of farm equipment. Her personal library has proved to be a tremendous asset to the editorial content of her magazines.

Schaefer has authored three books: Farm Tractor Collectibles, (MBI Publishing, in 1998), Oliver Tractors, (MBI Publishing, in 2001), and Classic Oliver Tractors: History, Models, Variations & Specifications 1855-1976, (Voyageur Press, 2009). Additionally, Schaefer has provided her expertise in other tractor-related books including: A Guide to Hart-Parr, Oliver and White Farm Tractors 1901-1996 by Larry Gay, Oliver Farm Tractors by T. Herbert Morrell, Oliver Photographic History by April Halberstadt and Ultimate American Farm Tractor Data Book Nebraska Test Tractors 1920-1960 by Lorry Dunning.
In January 2003, Schaefer was picked and approved by the Smithsonian Institution to assist with the restoration of the oldest mass-production gasoline tractor in existence. The tractor had not been in working condition since 1960, and a small team of experts were chosen to bring the tractor back to life for its 100-year anniversary.
In August 2003, Schaefer was an expert witness in Washington, D.C. to defend the Chinese Embassy regarding an international trade commission complaint filed by a US tractor manufacturer. She is an executive board member of the Illinois Rural Heritage Museum and a lifetime honorary member of the American Farm Heritage Museum. She has been the guest speaker at numerous community organizations and national tractor club gatherings. In 2011, Schaefer was honored by the I&I Tractor Club with an award of appreciation for her many contributions.
Schaefer regularly travels around the country to visit with former executives, engineers, employees, and farmers who are/were involved with the manufacture or use of farm equipment. She also attends various trade shows, toy shows, and tractor exhibits to share her passion of the farm equipment hobby.

She also serves as a publisher and editor of Oliver Heritage Magazine, an all Oliver tractor bi-monthly publication.

References

Transport magazines published in the United States
Magazines established in 2008
Bimonthly magazines published in the United States
Magazines published in Illinois